Issa Ahmed Al-Mohammadi  is a Qatari football defender who played for Qatar in the 1984 Asian Cup.

References

External links
Stats

1963 births
Living people
Qatari footballers
Qatar international footballers
Qatar Stars League players
Olympic footballers of Qatar
Footballers at the 1984 Summer Olympics
1984 AFC Asian Cup players
1988 AFC Asian Cup players
Association football defenders